The Philippines participated at the 19th Southeast Asian Games held in Jakarta, Indonesia from 11–19 October 1997.

SEA Games performance
The Philippines slipped from third place to fourth slot. Philippine officials had earlier predicted a third-place finish before the Games. The Philippines sent an 800-member delegation, the country's biggest SEA Games contingent ever. The Philippines surpassed their 33-gold mark in 1995 with a harvest of 43 golds, with 56 silvers and 108 bronzes.

Young gymnast Pia Adele Reyes was the only three-gold medal winner, winning individual titles in floor exercise and balance beam besides sharing the artistic team gold. She also bagged silver honors.

Elma Muros-Posadas ruled the heptathlon in a new SEA Games mark of 5,269 points. She captured her unprecedented seventh long jump title by clearing 6.45 meters. Swimmer Ryan Papa was the next best individual performer, winning two golds and three silvers.

The games that won golds for the country were Wushu, Fencing, Taekwondo, Golf and Archery. As expected, the Philippines won the gold in men's basketball.

Medalists

Gold

Silver

Bronze

Multiple

Medal summary

By sports

References

External links
http://www.olympic.ph

Southeast Asian Games
Nations at the 1997 Southeast Asian Games
1997